Diploscapter pachys is a species of nematode.

Taxonomy
This species was described by G. Steiner in 1942. Its type locality is Lexington, Kentucky and its type host is Hoya carnosa.

The specific epithet pachys comes from the Greek   meaning "thick".

Description
Steiner described its size as "very small but remarkably plump".

Males of this species have not been observed; this species reproduces asexually.

Genetics
A 2017 genetic study showed this species only has one chromosome pair, which resulted from the fusion of six pairs.

References

Further reading

 

Rhabditidae
Nematodes described in 1942